Kulosaari Church (Finnish: Kulosaaren kirkko, Swedish: Brändö kyrka) is a Lutheran church located in the Kulosaari suburb of Helsinki, Finland.

History
The Kulosaari parish was established in 1921, and the planning for a church began immediately; however, it took more than a decade before the current church building was completed in 1935.

The church is located on top of the tallest hill in Kulosaari, and became soon after its completion known locally as "the Temple on the Hill".

Architecture
The main church building was designed in Jugendstil style by Bertel Jung, who was also responsible for the overall urban plan of Kulosaari.

The separate belfry, completed four years before the church itself, and standing   from the church building, was initially designed by Armas Lindgren, and completed after his death by his daughter, architect Helena Stenij.

The church and its surrounding milieu have been designated and protected by the Finnish Heritage Agency as a nationally important built cultural environment (Valtakunnallisesti merkittävä rakennettu kulttuuriympäristö).

Interior design
The ceiling and the stained-glass window were designed by Armas Lindgren's son-in-law, artist .

Bertel Jung's daughter, interior architect , designed various interior features including the silver baptismal font, while his niece, textile artist Dora Jung, designed the priest's chasuble in white silk velvet.

See also
Kulosaari Cemetery

References

Lutheran churches in Finland
20th-century churches in Finland
20th-century Lutheran churches
Churches completed in 1935
Churches in Helsinki
Kulosaari